Uvvu is a 1982 Indian Malayalam film, directed by Ben Marcose. The film stars Jalaja and Sankar Mohan in the lead roles. The film has musical score by MB Sreenivasan.

Cast
Jalaja
Sankar Mohan

Soundtrack
The music was composed by M. B. Sreenivasan and the lyrics were written by O. N. V. Kurup.

References

External links
 

1982 films
1980s Malayalam-language films